

Airline operators

Data updated on 22 April 2022.

Former airline operators

See also

 List of Airbus A320 orders
 List of Airbus A320neo family orders

References

External links

Operators
Airbus A320